Eyes Wide, Tongue Tied is the fourth album by the Scottish rock band The Fratellis. The album was announced on 1 June 2015 with the first track, "Me and the Devil" (which was given away for free from the band's website), and released on 21 August 2015. The album was written and recorded in Los Angeles during November 2014 with Tony Hoffer, who also produced the band's first album Costello Music and Jon Fratelli's solo album Psycho Jukebox.

Recording 
After the release of The Soul Crush EP in September 2014, and the band's first shows in Russia, it was announced that they would go to Los Angeles to record the follow up to We Need Medicine. During the tour for that album, the band debuted the new songs "All the Livelong Day", which later became "Impostors (Little By Little)" and "Too Much Wine". They went to record the new album during January 2014, and after various attempts they gave up and decided to bring back Tony Hoffer. During that session, "Me and the Devil" was the third song to make it onto the record. Every other song was discarded for the time being.

"Rosanna" uses the same melody as a track released for free on Codeine Velvet Club's website called "Mellotron Boogie No 3". Jon Fratelli said at the time that it would probably find its place somewhere one day. The title of the album comes from the bonus track "Medusa In Chains".

Track listing

Personnel 

Band
 Jon Fratelli – guitar and vocals, piano 
 Barry Fratelli – bass guitar and backing vocals (tracks 1-13, 19-21)
 Mince Fratelli – drums and backing vocals (tracks 1-13, 19-21)

Additional musicians
 Will Foster - piano and keyboards on "I Know Your Kind" and "I'm Gonna Be Your Elvis"

Production (tracks 1-13)
 Tony Hoffer - producer
 Tony Hoffer - mixer
 Cameron Lister - engineer
 Dave Cooley - mastering
 Recorded at The Hobby Shop Recording Studios, Los Angeles

'''Production (tracks 14-21)
 Stuart McCredie - producer and mixing
 Dean Honer - mastering (tracks 14-18)
 Callum Malcolm - mastering (tracks 19-21)

Charts

References

2015 albums
The Fratellis albums
Albums produced by Tony Hoffer